Fire Kite is an EP of the band Eisley released in anticipation of their third full-length album and to promote their fall/winter 2009 tour. It was released October 13, 2009 on Sire Records. There are two versions of the EP.  The digital version has an extra demo song, whereas the hard copy has an Eisley cover by Max Bemis of Say Anything.
The physical version is only printed for 3000 copies due to the label marketing strategy.

Track listing
All songs written by Eisley.

References

Eisley albums
2009 EPs